Shubenacadie Sam is a Canadian groundhog who lives at the Shubenacadie Wildlife Park in the town of Shubenacadie, Nova Scotia. Every February 2, on Groundhog Day, Sam's shadow is closely observed at 08:00 AST to make the traditional prediction whether there will be an early spring. Due to Nova Scotia's Atlantic Time Zone, Sam makes the first Groundhog Day prediction in North America.

The prediction ceremony is usually heralded by a bagpiper and town crier and draws an early-morning festive crowd of families and visitors. Shubenacadie Sam predicted a long winter in 2023. The live ceremony with members of the public resumed this year after being held virtual for the last two years as due to Covid-19 precautions.

History
The Shubenacadie Sam tradition began about 1987 and differs from most other famous groundhogs as he is not woken from hibernation for Groundhog Day. By 2018, four ground hogs had served as "Shubenacadie Sam" since the practice began in Nova Scotia, as groundhogs usually live 10-15 years in captivity. In 2021, Sam was a 7-year-old female groundhog.  Park employees served as the caretaker for Shubenacadie Sam and the park's groundhogs for almost 17 years. They provided breakfast for the groundhog, usually yogurt and melon. Staff also read to the groundhog who has been designated an advocate for Family Literacy Day. Shubenacadie Sam usually draws around 200 spectators for his or her prediction.

Predictions

Biting Incident
In 2018, Sam bit the finger of CBC reporter Brett Ruskin when the reporter grabbed the groundhog to stop Sam from climbing out of the groundhog enclosure.

Background
While Shubenacadie offers the earliest prediction every year, it is one of many towns throughout North America known for their winter-predicting groundhogs. The most famous is Punxsutawney Phil of Punxsutawney, Pennsylvania, United States. The most famous Canadian groundhog is Wiarton Willie in Ontario, Canada. Sam shares the Nova Scotia prediction every year with "Two Rivers Tunnel" in Cape Breton at the Two Rivers Wildlife Park  in Mira River, Nova Scotia, although "Two Rivers Tunnel" is awakened for its prediction just after 11 am instead of 8 am. Promoters of a lobster festival in Barrington Passage, Nova Scotia created a "Lucy the Lobster" ritual in 2018 with a lobster that crawled from the water to a lobster trap on Groundhog Day.

Shubenacadie Sam's prediction, like all weather-predicting groundhogs, bears little relation to seasonal weather trends as it is based on random location conditions, according to Meteorologist Cindy Day. Shubenacadie Sam has an accuracy rate of about 45%, according to Day, compared to 39% for Punxsutawney Phil and 25% for Wiarton Willie.

See also
Groundhog Day

Notes

External links
  Shubenacadie Sam "Groundhog", Shubenacadie Provincial Wildlife Park website
 Sam cam, (live webcam) available from January to February 3.

Canadian culture
Culture of Nova Scotia
Individual groundhogs
Holiday characters
Hants County, Nova Scotia
Oracular animals
Individual animals in Canada
Groundhog Day